Opensouls were a New Zealand band formed in 2001. After releasing numerous vinyl EPs, the band released their critically acclaimed debut album Kaleidoscope which impressed reviewers and fans alike. While this album draws inspiration from soul, reggae, jazz & blues styles, their next album, Standing in the Rain, was made with the intent to reflect the sound and feeling of a particular musical era: late 1950s and early 1960s British and American R&B. The band split up in 2011, playing their final live shows.

Band members
Bjorn Petersen – Vocals
Tyra Hammond – Vocals
Jeremy Toy - Guitar
Chip Mathews – Bass
Steph "Cee" Brown - Keys
Julien Dyne - Percussion
Scott Towers - Saxophone
Cam Allen - Saxophone
Isaac "Aesh" Aesili - Trumpet
Harlin Davey - Turntables

Discography

Albums

Awards and nominations
 Kaleidoscope was nominated for the Best Urban/Hip Hop album at the 2006 New Zealand Music Awards.
'What Do You Do?’ claimed the best hip-hop song at the 2006 bNet awards.

References

External links

New Zealand contemporary R&B musical groups
Musical groups established in 2001